The White Guard is a novel by Mikhail Bulgakov, first published in 1925 in literary journal Rossiya. It was not reprinted in the Soviet Union until 1966.

Background 
The White Guard first appeared in serial form in the Soviet-era literary journal Rossiya in 1925, but the magazine was closed down before the serial was completed. The complete book was published in Paris in 1927. The censored version was published in the Soviet Union in 1966. The complete version was published in 1989.

After the first two parts of The White Guard were published in Rossiya, Bulgakov was invited to write a version for the stage. He called the play The Days of the Turbins.  This was produced at the Moscow Art Theatre, to great acclaim. According to some sources, Stalin saw it no fewer than 20 times. 
In fact, the play completely overshadowed the book, which was in any event virtually unobtainable in any form.

Plot 
Set in Ukraine, beginning in late 1918, the novel concerns the fate of the Turbin family as the various armies of the Ukrainian War of Independence  the Whites, the Reds, the Imperial German Army, and Ukrainian nationalists  fight over the city (presumably Kyiv). Historical figures such as Pyotr Wrangel, Symon Petliura and Pavlo Skoropadsky appear as the Turbin family is caught up in the turbulent effects of the October Revolution.

The novel's characters belong to the sphere of Ukrainian and Russian intellectuals and officers. In the army of Hetman Pavlo Skoropadskyi they participate in the defense of Kyiv from the forces of Ukrainian Nationalists (led by Petliura) in December 1918. The character Mikhail Shpolyansky is modelled on Viktor Shklovsky.

The novel contains many autobiographical elements. Bulgakov gave the younger Turbin brother some of the characteristics of his own younger brother.  The description of the house of the Turbins is that of the house of the Bulgakov family in Kyiv. (Today it is preserved and operated as the Mikhail Bulgakov Museum).

Characters 
 Alexey Vasilyevich Turbin, a physician 
 Nikolai Turbin (Nikolka), his younger brother
 Elena Vasilyevna Talberg, their sister
 Sergei Ivanovich Talberg, her husband
 Viktor Viktorovich Myshlaevsky, lieutenant 
 Leonid Yuryevich Shervinsky
 Fyodor Nikolaievich Stepanov, nicknamed Carp (Karas)
 Father Alexander
 Vasily Ivanovich Lisovich, nicknamed Vasilisa
 Larion Larionovich Surzhansky (Lariosik)
 Colonel Nai-Turs

English translations 
Bulgakov's widow had The White Guard published in large part in the literary journal Moskva in 1966, at the end of the Khrushchev era. This was the basis for the English translation by Michael Glenny, first published in 1971. This lacks the dream flashback sections. In 2008 Yale University Press published a translation by Marian Schwartz of the complete novel, an edition which won an award.

 The White Guard, translated by Michael Glenny, London: Collins and Harvill Press, 1971. .
London: Harvill, 1996. Revised edition. .
 White Guard, translated by Marian Schwartz, introduction by Evgeny Dobrenko. New Haven: Yale University Press, 2008.  
 The White Guard, translated by Roger Cockrell. Richmond: Alma Classics, 2012. .

Adaptations 
 The Days of the Turbins, a 1925 stage adaptation written by Bulgakov.
 The Days of the Turbins (film), a 1976 3-part television adaptation of the play.
 The White Guard (TV series), a 2012 mini-series adaptation of the book.

References

External links 

 .
 .

1966 novels
1925 Russian novels
Novels set during the Russian Civil War
Novels set in the Russian Revolution
Soviet novels
Novels by Mikhail Bulgakov
Novels first published in serial form
Works originally published in Russian magazines
Works originally published in literary magazines
Novels set in Ukraine
Novels set in Kyiv